Reindalspasset is a mountain pass in Nordenskiöld Land at Spitsbergen, Svalbard. It separates the 38 kilometer long valley of Reindalen from the 14 kilometer long valley Lundströmdalen.

References

Mountain passes of Svalbard